Jenny Cooper (formerly credited as Jenny Levine) is a Canadian actress. She made her professional debut in 1995 as series star Molly in the Canadian TV series Jake and the Kid as the series regular Molly, went on to star in the Showtime series Fast Track, and has subsequently been a guest star in numerous shows including Monk, Scandal, The Outer Limits and CSI Miami. Cooper also starred in the miniseries The Feast of All Saints. Cooper also played trauma surgeon Jenny Blake in the 2015 TV mystery drama Open Heart.

Major roles
Cooper had a recurring role as Valerie Harris on four episodes of the Fox TV series 24, portraying a Homeland Security official who was part of a takeover of the Counter Terrorism Unit. She said in a Toronto Star interview in 2008 that the project reunited her with Jon Cassar, the show's executive producer who had directed her on Jake and the Kid. Because each season of the show takes place on one day, she never had a wardrobe change. She said, "You get six or seven multiples of the same outfit. Good thing I look good in blue. I had a navy blue suit with a light blue shirt."

In 2013, Cooper was the screenwriter, co-producer and one of the lead actors on the Canadian film I Think I Do. The romantic comedy was set in Edmonton and also filmed on location in the city. Cooper portrayed the sister of characters portrayed by Mia Kirshner and Sara Canning, who together run a wedding planning company. Janney also played a guest role in various TV shows such as Doc, The Outer Limits, Nash Bridges, and Monk.

Personal life
Cooper was born in 1974 in Toronto, grew up in Key Biscayne, Florida and lives in Los Angeles. She began acting in school plays at age 11.

Filmography

Film

Television

References

External links 
 

Actresses from Toronto
20th-century Canadian actresses
21st-century Canadian actresses
Canadian film actresses
Canadian television actresses
Living people
1974 births